Bathydomus is a genus of sea snails, marine gastropod mollusks in the family Buccinidae, the true whelks.

Species
Species within the genus Bathydomus include:

 Bathydomus obtectus Thiele, 1912

References

External links

Buccinidae
Monotypic gastropod genera